Live at Hammersmith '79 is a live album by American rock musician Ted Nugent, consisting of a performance originally broadcast on the King Biscuit Flower Hour, recorded during the second set of a sold-out night at London's Hammersmith Odeon in 1979 and not released until 1997.

Track listing
"Stormtroopin'" – 5:57
"Just What the Doctor Ordered" – 4:57
"Free-for-All" – 8:17
"Dog Eat Dog" – 5:52
"Cat Scratch Fever" – 4:08
"Need You Bad" – 5:17
"Paralyzed" – 5:03
"It Don't Matter" – 3:19
"Wang Dang Sweet Poontang" – 8:05
"Stranglehold/Smokescreen" – 10:29
"Motor City Madhouse" – 10:10
"Gonzo" – 3:57

Personnel
Band members
 Ted Nugent – guitar, percussion, vocals
 Charlie Huhn – guitar, vocals
 Steve McRay – keyboards
 Dave Kiswiney – bass
 Cliff Davies – drums, background vocals
 Tom Werman – percussion

Production
 Bob Irwin – producer
 Lew Futterman – original recording producer
 Tim Geelan – mixing
 Vic Anesini – mastering

References

Ted Nugent albums
1997 live albums
Epic Records live albums
Legacy Recordings live albums
Albums recorded at the Hammersmith Apollo